Singapore competed at the 2004 Summer Olympics in Athens, Greece, from 13 to 29 August 2004. This was the nation's thirteenth appearance at the Olympics, except for two different editions. Singapore was part of the Malaysian team at the 1964 Summer Olympics in Tokyo, but did not attend at the 1980 Summer Olympics in Moscow, because of its support for the United States boycott.

The Singapore National Olympic Council sent a total of sixteen athletes to the Games, six men and ten women, to compete in six different sports. The nation's team size was roughly denser from Sydney by two athletes, being considered its largest delegation since the 1956 Summer Olympics in Melbourne. For the first time in its Olympic history, Singapore was represented by more female than male athletes. Eight Singaporean athletes had previously competed in Sydney four years earlier; five of which were swimmers, including four-time Olympian and multiple-time Southeast Asian Games champion Joscelin Yeo. Meanwhile, badminton player Ronald Susilo was appointed by the council to carry the Singaporean flag in the opening ceremony.

Singapore, however, failed to win a single Olympic medal in Athens since the 1960 Summer Olympics in Rome, where Tan Howe Liang claimed silver in men's weightlifting. Table tennis player Li Jiawei narrowly missed the nation's first ever medal in 44 years, after losing out her match against South Korea's Kim Kyung-Ah for the bronze.

Athletics

Singaporean athletes have so far achieved qualifying standards in the following athletics events (up to a maximum of 3 athletes in each event at the 'A' Standard, and 1 at the 'B' Standard).

Men
Track & road events

Women
Field events

Key
Note–Ranks given for track events are within the athlete's heat only
Q = Qualified for the next round
q = Qualified for the next round as a fastest loser or, in field events, by position without achieving the qualifying target
NR = National record
N/A = Round not applicable for the event
Bye = Athlete not required to compete in round

Badminton

Sailing

Singaporean sailors have qualified one boat for each of the following events.

Open

M = Medal race; OCS = On course side of the starting line; DSQ = Disqualified; DNF = Did not finish; DNS= Did not start; RDG = Redress given

Shooting 

Singapore has qualified a single shooter.

Men

Swimming

Singaporean swimmers earned qualifying standards in the following events (up to a maximum of 2 swimmers in each event at the A-standard time, and 1 at the B-standard time):

Men

Women

Table tennis

Four Singaporean table tennis players qualified for the following events.

See also
 Singapore at the 2002 Asian Games
 Singapore at the 2004 Summer Paralympics

References

External links
Official Report of the XXVIII Olympiad
Singapore National Olympic Council

Nations at the 2004 Summer Olympics
2004
Summer Olympics